Walkerton may refer to:

Walkerton, Ontario, a town in Canada
 The Walkerton Hawks, a Canadian ice hockey team
 The Walkerton Capitals, a Canadian ice hockey team
 The Walkerton E. coli outbreak, involving the contamination of the town water supply in 2000
Walkerton, Indiana, a town in the state of Indiana in the United States
Walkerton, Virginia, a village in the state of Virginia in the United States
The Battle of Walkerton, which took place in Virginia during the American Civil War
Walkerton (Glen Allen, Virginia), a historic tavern building